Retrop is a community in Oklahoma, United States located on the Washita/Beckham county line. It is located at the southern junction between State Highway 6 and SH-55. Retrop receives its name from the original community (Old Retrop) which is one mile south and one mile east in Washita County near the Retrop Cemetery. The Retrop Post Office (located at Old Retrop) existed from January 12, 1900, until February 28, 1905. The name is a reverse spelling of the surname of the first postmaster, Ira J. Porter.

See also
 List of geographic names derived from anagrams and ananyms

References

Unincorporated communities in Beckham County, Oklahoma
Unincorporated communities in Washita County, Oklahoma
Unincorporated communities in Oklahoma